Hazelton is a city in Jerome County, Idaho, United States. The population was 753 at the 2010 census. It is part of the Twin Falls, Idaho Micropolitan Statistical Area.

Geography
Hazelton is located at  (42.594681, -114.136531).

Education 
Valley School is the only school in Hazelton, Idaho that consists of K-12 classrooms; Valley Elementary School, Valley Middle School, and Valley High School. The 1A school features a Viking as their mascot.

Demographics

2010 census
As of the census of 2010, there were 753 people, 254 households, and 187 families residing in the city. The racial makeup of the city was 45.9% White, 0.1% Native American, 0.3% Asian, 2.0% from other races, and 2.7% from two or more races. Hispanic or Latino of any race were 52.0% of the population.

There were 254 households, of which 44.9% had children under the age of 18 living with them, 59.8% were married couples living together, 10.6% had a female householder with no husband present, 3.1% had a male householder with no wife present, and 26.4% were non-families. 22.4% of all households were made up of individuals, and 11.4% had someone living alone who was 65 years of age or older. The average household size was 2.96 and the average family size was 3.56.

The median age in the city was 31.2 years. 33.6% of residents were under the age of 18; 8.9% were between the ages of 18 and 24; 24.7% were from 25 to 44; 20.8% were from 45 to 64; and 12% were 65 years of age or older. The gender makeup of the city was 50.3% male and 49.7% female.

2000 census
As of the census of 2000, there were 687 people, 238 households, and 172 families residing in the city. The racial makeup of the city was 83.55% White, 0.87% African American, 1.31% Native American, 13.39% from other races, and 0.87% from two or more races. Hispanic or Latino of any race were 26.64% of the population.

There were 238 households, out of which 41.2% had children under the age of 18 living with them, 58.8% were married couples living together, 9.2% had a female householder with no husband present, and 27.7% were non-families. 23.9% of all households were made up of individuals, and 15.5% had someone living alone who was 65 years of age or older.  The average household size was 2.89 and the average family size was 3.53.

In the city, the population was spread out, with 34.2% under the age of 18, 8.3% from 18 to 24, 25.6% from 25 to 44, 17.2% from 45 to 64, and 14.7% who were 65 years of age or older.  The median age was 32 years. For every 100 females, there were 99.1 males.  For every 100 females age 18 and over, there were 100.0 males.

The median income for a household in the city was $22,596, and the median income for a family was $30,000. Males had a median income of $30,132 versus $18,125 for females. The per capita income for the city was $10,215.  About 24.1% of families and 29.5% of the population were below the poverty line, including 37.7% of those under age 18 and 10.6% of those age 65 or over.

History
Annie Pike Greenwood wrote 1934 autobiography We Sagebrush Folks, an autobiography published in 1934 about farm life near Hazelton.

References

Cities in Idaho
Cities in Jerome County, Idaho
Twin Falls, Idaho metropolitan area